Lieutenant Harold Lothrop Borden (23 May 1876 – 16 July 1900) was from Canning, Nova Scotia and the only son of Canada's Minister of Defence and Militia, Frederick William Borden and related to future Prime Minister Robert Laird Borden. Serving in the Royal Canadian Dragoons, he became the most famous Canadian casualty of the Second Boer War.  Queen Victoria asked F. W. Borden for a photograph of his son, Prime Minister Wilfrid Laurier praised his services, tributes arrived from across Canada, and in his home town a monument (by Hamilton MacCarthy) was erected to his memory.

Early life
Borden was born in 1876. He acquired an arts degree at Mount Allison University and was enrolled in medical school at McGill University when he enlisted in the war.

Military career

Borden's military career began in 1893, when he entered The King's Canadian Hussars. In 1897, as a member of Queen Victoria's Diamond Jubilee Contingent he received the Jubilee Medal. By 1899 he rose to the rank of Major in command of this corps. At the outbreak of the Second Boer War Borden received a commission as lieutenant with the 1st Battalion, Canadian Mounted Rifles (which shortly after his death became known as The Royal Canadian Dragoons (Special Service Force)) and allotted to the 1st Battalion, "B" Squadron as officer commanding the 4th Troop. He was brought to the attention of Field Marshal Lord Roberts', the British commander-in-chief in South Africa, for repeatedly swimming with Richard Turner across the Vet River at Coetzee's Drift, to draw the fire of the Boers who were dug in on the north bank (5 May 1900).

Borden also fought with distinction at the Battle of Faber's Put (30 May 1900). The battle was one of the most desperate actions faced by Canadians while campaigning in South Africa: 27 killed, 41 wounded, and the loss of a large number of horses. Field Marshal Lord Roberts reported: "Lieut. H. L. Borden, gallant conduct in swimming the Vet River under fire, 5 May, and in capturing some of the enemy’s wagons on 30 May."

The death of Lieutenant Harold Lothrop Borden at Witpoort on 16 July 1900 occurred when Lieutenant John Edgar Burch and he, while assisting the Royal Irish Fusiliers and some New Zealanders withstand a Boer assault on Witpoort ridge, led a counter-attack. It was successful, but Boer marksmen, standing less than 200 metres away, shot them as they stood up to lead the assault. Lord Roberts reported to the War Office that Borden and Burch "were killed while gallantly leading their men in a counter attack upon the enemy's flank at a critical juncture of his assault upon our position."

Legacy
Borden is commemorated with various monuments and plaques.  In his home town, Canning, Nova Scotia is a statue by Hamilton MacCarthy.  In Halifax, Nova Scotia the base of the South African War Memorial has a panel commemorating the Battle of Witpoort.  There is also a memorial plaque to Borden at McGill University, Montreal, in the Strathcona Medical Building (now the Strathcona Anatomy and Dentistry Building). Borden was a medical student at McGill before joining the war effort. He is listed on the Memorial Arch at  the Royal Military College of Canada. Finally, there is also a plaque to Borden and others who died at Witpoort at Braamfontein Cemetery in South Africa where he is buried.

Gallery

See also
Military history of Nova Scotia

References

Further reading

External links
Image of Monument to British Soldiers who died in Battle of Witpoort
Harold Borden Story
Memorial plaque, Srathcona Anatomy and Dentistry Building, McGill University, Montreal
Battle of Cortzee Drift

Battle of Faber's Put 
 Poem to Borden by Florence Sherk
Veterans Affairs Canada

1876 births
1900 deaths
People from Kings County, Nova Scotia
People of New England Planter descent
Canadian military personnel of the Second Boer War
Cornell family
Military history of Nova Scotia
Royal Canadian Dragoons officers
Canadian military personnel killed in the Second Boer War
Canadian military memorials and cemeteries
Monuments and memorials in Nova Scotia
Canadian Militia officers
Canadian military personnel from Nova Scotia